The 2010 Spanish motorcycle Grand Prix, officially the Gran Premio bwin de España, was the second round of the 2010 Grand Prix motorcycle racing season. It took place on the weekend of 30 April–2 May 2010 at the Circuito de Jerez located in Jerez de la Frontera, Spain. Jorge Lorenzo snatched a last-lap win in the MotoGP race to move top of the world championship standings.

This event would be the last podium for Japanese Moto2 rider, Shoya Tomizawa; who finished in second place, before his death on 5 September 2010 at the San Marino Grand Prix.

MotoGP classification

Moto2 classification
The Moto2 race was red-flagged on the second lap after a fluid spill caused many riders to fall in the same turn. The race was later restarted, with the distance shortened to 17 laps from the original 26.

125 cc classification

Championship standings after the race (MotoGP)
Below are the standings for the top five riders and constructors after round two has concluded.

Riders' Championship standings

Constructors' Championship standings

 Note: Only the top five positions are included for both sets of standings.

References

Spanish motorcycle Grand Prix
Spanish
motorcycle